"Lost Cause" is the fifth song from Beck's fifth major-label studio album, Sea Change. It was also released as a promo single only, in the UK, Germany, and Japan.

It reached number 36 on the Billboard Alternative Airplay chart on March 22, 2003.

MTV.com described "Lost Cause" as "sparse and melancholy, driven by a folksy guitar passage and soft, sedated vocals and embellished with soft brush drumming."

Music video
Two music videos were made for "Lost Cause", both directed by Garth Jennings. The original video features an effigy of Beck falling from the sky. It was produced entirely in Adobe Photoshop. The second version just features the band playing the song.

References

External links

Beck songs
Song recordings produced by Nigel Godrich
2002 singles
Songs written by Beck
Songs about Los Angeles